Trapani–Birgi Airport , is a military air base and public airport serving Trapani, in Sicily, Italy. Located between Trapani and Marsala, it is one of the five civil airports in Sicily. In 2015, 1,586,992 passengers passed through the airport, making it the third-busiest airport in Sicily. The air base of the Aeronautica Militare in named after the aviator Livio Bassi. The civil airport is named after the Sicilian industrialist Vincenzo Florio Sr.

Overview
After a long period of inactivity the airport was relaunched by the Province of Trapani in 2003, and now hosts several flights, mainly low-cost connections.

History

Inaugurated in 1964 as a regional airport operating very few flights, Trapani–Birgi became even less important in the 1990s, during which only a flight to Pantelleria, Palermo and Rome was operated.

The airport was relaunched in 2003 by the Province of Trapani and grew in size after Ryanair started to use it as its main hub to Sicily, bringing several new international flights to and from Trapani. The airport has consequently been recognised as instrumental for the tourism-related economy of Western Sicily.

Italian Air Force

The military airfield, inaugurated in 1961, is named after the Italian aviator Livio Bassi. The airport is a base for the "37th Fighter Wing" of the Italian Air Force with the Eurofighter Typhoon, and for the "82nd CSAR" (Combat Search and Rescue) with the helicopters AgustaWestland AW139.

The airfield is one of the four forward operating bases (FOBs) used by the NATO Airborne Early Warning and Control Force based at NATO Air Base Geilenkirchen in Geilenkirchen, Germany. 
The airport gained international attention during Operation Unified Protector in 2011 when NATO aircraft were based there during military intervention in the Libyan Civil War.

Airlines and destinations
The following airlines operate regular scheduled and charter flights at Trapani–Birgi Airport:

Statistics

This table does not include passengers in transit. Ryanair discontinued most of its flights from Trapani airport in October 2017, resulting in a significant reduction in the number of passengers using the airport.

aData from Assaeroporti.

Transport

See also
Trapani–Milo Airport Luigi Broglio – first airport of Trapani, today used by the Italian Space Agency.
Trapani–Chinisia Airport Livio Bassi – second airport of Trapani, open between 1949 and 1971.
Catania Airport Vincenzo Bellini – Sicily's major international airport.
Palermo Airport Falcone e Borsellino – also known as Punta Raisi Airport, another international airport in Sicily
Comiso Airport Vincenzo Magliocco – it is another of Sicily's airports

References

External links

 Official website
 Sicily Transportation Map
 
 

Airports in Sicily
Airport
Trapani
NATO installations in Italy
Florio family
Airports established in 1961
1961 establishments in Italy